Richard Dennis (born 31 July 1966) is a former Australian rules footballer who played for Carlton and North Melbourne in the VFL/AFL.

Dennis was a half forward from Western Australia and debuted in Carlton's premiership season of 1987, playing 23 games. He played his final season at North Melbourne in 1992.

External links

1966 births
Living people
Australian rules footballers from Western Australia
Carlton Football Club players
Carlton Football Club Premiership players
North Melbourne Football Club players
East Perth Football Club players
Western Australian State of Origin players
One-time VFL/AFL Premiership players